Buracona is a small bay in the northwest of the island of Sal, Cape Verde. The bay is approximately 5 km north of the village Palmeira. The bay is part of the  protected landscape of Buracona-Ragona, which covers the coast between Palmeira and Ponta Preta, and the mountain Monte Leste (269 m elevation).

See also
Geography of Cape Verde
List of protected areas in Cape Verde

References

Bays of Cape Verde
Geography of Sal, Cape Verde
Protected areas of Cape Verde